Bösch is a surname. Notable people with the name include:

 Beat Bösch (born 1971), Swiss athlete
 Fabian Bösch (born 1997), Swiss freestyle skier
 Fritz Bösch, Swiss rower
 Herbert Bösch (born 1954), Austrian politician
 Tamara Bösch (born 1989), Austrian handballer

See also 
 Boesch
 Bosch (surname)